The Object of My Affection is the second album by the country music singer Faron Young, released in 1958 via Capitol Records. The album contains country versions of many of the popular standards that Young sang as a teenager.

Buck Owens, Young's guitarist, wanted to sing on the album. Young declined the request, because he feared losing Owens to a solo career, but eventually helped to sign him after listening to a demo.

Critical reception
Billboard wrote that the album included "pretty standards ... done up with poppish, slightly rocking backings."

Track listing

References

1958 albums
Faron Young albums